Four ships of the Royal Navy have borne the name HMS Topaze, after the French word for the gemstone Topaz:

She was handed over to the British in 1793 by French royalists, and was sold in 1814.
 HMS Topaze (1814), a 38-gun fifth rate, previously the French frigate Étoile. She was captured by Hebrus in 1814 and became a receiving ship in 1823.  She was used as a target from 1850 and broken up in 1851.  
 , a  wood screw frigate launched in 1858 and sold in 1884.
 , a  launched in 1903, and sold in 1921.

There was also a naval trawler named . She does not seem to have been formally commissioned into the Royal Navy, and does not have the HMS prefix.

Royal Navy ship names